Two ships of the Royal Navy have borne the name HMS Eurydice, after Eurydice, a character in Greek mythology:

  was a 24-gun post ship launched in 1781 and broken up in 1834.
  was a 24-gun post ship launched in 1843. She became a training ship in 1861, and foundered in 1878.

Royal Navy ship names